Parsol is the trade name of a number of UV absorbers:
Avobenzone (Parsol 1789)
4-Methylbenzylidene camphor (Parsol 5000)
Polysilicone-15 (Parsol SLX)